Diamonds Adrift is a 1921 American silent romantic comedy film directed by Chester Bennett and starring Earle Williams, Beatrice Burnham and Otis Harlan.

Cast
 Earle Williams as	Bob Bellamy
 Beatrice Burnham as Consuelo Velasco
 Otis Harlan as Brick McCann
 George Field as Don Manuel Morales
 Jack Carlyle as Home Brew
 Hector V. Sarno as Señor Rafael Velasco
 Melbourne MacDowell as James Bellamy

References

Bibliography
 Munden, Kenneth White. The American Film Institute Catalog of Motion Pictures Produced in the United States, Part 1. University of California Press, 1997.

External links
 

1921 films
1921 drama films
American silent feature films
American drama films
American black-and-white films
Films directed by Chester Bennett
Vitagraph Studios films
1920s English-language films
1920s American films
Silent American drama films